Acton Green may refer to:

 Acton Green, Herefordshire
 Acton Green, London